Lysceia is a monotypic moth genus in the subfamily Arctiinae described by Francis Walker in 1854. It contains a single species, Lysceia bigutta, described by the same author in the same book, which is found in South Africa.

References

Endemic moths of South Africa
Lithosiini
Monotypic moth genera
Moths of Africa